Peter Paul Mahoney (June 25, 1848 – March 27, 1889), of Brooklyn, New York, was an American businessman and politician who served two terms as a U.S. Representative from New York from 1885 to 1889. He was a Democrat.

Biography 
Mahoney was born in New York City and educated in the public schools there. He engaged in the dry-goods business for several years; moved to Brooklyn, New York, and engaged in the sale of liquor.

Congress 
He was  elected as a Democrat to the Forty-ninth and Fiftieth Congresses (March 4, 1885 - March 3, 1889); was not a candidate in 1888 for reelection to the Fifty-first Congress.

Death 
He became ill while attending the inauguration ceremonies of President Benjamin Harrison March 4, 1889, and died in Washington, D.C., March 27, 1889 at the age of 40. He is interred in Calvary Cemetery, Long Island City, Queens County, New York.

References

External links
Peter Paul Mahoney entry at The Political Graveyard

 

1848 births
1889 deaths
Burials at Calvary Cemetery (Queens)
People from Brooklyn
Democratic Party members of the United States House of Representatives from New York (state)
19th-century American politicians